Masyaf District  is a district (mantiqah) administratively belonging to Hama Governorate, Syria. At the 2004 Census it had a population of 169,341. Its administrative centre is the city of Masyaf.

Sub-districts
The district of Masyaf is divided into five sub-districts or nahiyahs (population according to 2004 official census):
Masyaf Subdistrict (ناحية مصياف): population 68,184.
Jubb Ramlah Subdistrict (ناحية جب رملة): population 39,814.
Awj Subdistrict (ناحية عوج): population 33,344.
Ayn Halaqim Subdistrict (ناحية عين حلاقيم): population 16,502.
Wadi al-Uyun Subdistrict (ناحية وادي العيون): population 12,951.

References